Gustave-Adolphe Hirn (21 August 1815 – 14 January 1890) was a French physicist, astronomer, mathematician, and engineer who made important measurements of the mechanical equivalent of heat and contributions to the early development of thermodynamics. He further applied his science in the practical development of steam engines.

Life

Hirn was born in Logelbach, near Colmar, into the prosperous textile-manufacturing family Haussmann. Baron Haussmann was a cousin. At 19, he entered his grandfather's cotton factory as a chemist. Later he worked as an engineer, and began research on mechanics, especially on calorics. Hirn carried out numerous experiments during his career, demonstrating the relevance of Carnot's principle in animated engines: the equivalence of thermal and mechanical energy. His work on thermodynamics is considered a major work of the 19th century. Indeed, he deduced from his work an equation of state that introduced both the notion of free volume and internal pressure, notions that would reappear with the work of van der Waals with a different corpuscular conception.

He was made a member of the French Academy of Science in 1867; in 1880 founded a meteorological observatory near Colmar; and later devoted himself to astronomy. Hirn was educated in the shop, and his works are marked by much practical criticism of mere academic theory.

Hirn invented the pandynanometer in 1880 and published a theory of the origin and chemical composition of Saturn's rings, exchanging correspondence with Urbain Jean Joseph Leverrier. In 1886, he was elected as a member to the American Philosophical Society.

He made significant contributions to the field of tribology. His study of friction in journal bearings revealed all the essential features of fluid film lubrication, although it lacked theoretical justification. For this contribution, he was named as one of the 23 "Men of Tribology" by Duncan Dowson.

He died in Colmar in 1890.

Honours
Chevalier of the Légion d'Honneur (1865)

Bibliography

References

Further reading
Donkin, B. (1893) “Life and work of G.A. Hirn”, Cassier's Magazine, pp. 233–239
 (in French)

External links

Short biography (in French)
Paris-Province: Energy Physics in Mid-nineteenth-century France by Faidra Papanelopoulou
The Body and the Metaphors of the Engine

1815 births
1890 deaths
French physicists
19th-century French engineers
19th-century French astronomers
Tribologists
Chevaliers of the Légion d'honneur
Members of the French Academy of Sciences
Members of the American Philosophical Society